Iognáid G. Ó Muircheartaigh is an Irish academic who served as President of NUI Galway between 2000 and 2008. The Ó Muircheartaigh Hall in the Sports Centre is named in his honour.

Early life and education 
From County Kerry, he attended an Irish-speaking school, Colaiste Mhuire, on Dublin's Parnell Square.  He then attended University College Dublin. He earned a PhD in Statistics at the University of Glasgow, and he was awarded a Fulbright Fellowship at Stanford University, and a US National Academy of Sciences Senior Research Associateship at the US Naval Postgraduate School in Monterey, California.

Academic career 
During his term as president, NUI Galway conferred honorary doctorates on Nelson Mandela, Louise Arbour, Sr. Helen Prejean, Richard Goldstone, Philippe Kirsch, Pius Langa and Cyril Ramaphosa.

As an adjunct professor in Human Rights, he continues to undertake research in Statistics, with applications in Human Rights, Economics, and Medicine.

Other roles 
Ó Muircheartaigh has also served on the board of directors of Aer Arann.

Recognition 
He was conferred with honorary doctorates by both the University of Connecticut and the University of Massachusetts.

References

20th-century Irish people
Presidents of the University of Galway
People from County Kerry
People educated at Coláiste Mhuire, Dublin
People from County Galway
21st-century Irish people